The 1989 Copa de S.M. La Reina de Fútbol was the sixth edition of the Spanish women's football competition previously known as Campeonato Nacional de Fútbol Femenino and the first one under this name. Due to the launching of a national league (Liga Nacional) in this season the competition lost its status as a national championship to become the country's national cup.

Ten teams took part in the competition, which took place from 14 May to 25 June 1989. Liga Nacional runner-up Parque Alcobendas won the competition by beating Añorga KKE 4–2 in the final, which was held in Logroño's Las Gaunas just before the 1988–89 Copa del Rey Juvenil's final. Defending champion Oiartzun KE was defeated by local rival Añorga in the semifinals.

Results

First round

|}

Quarter-finals

|}

Semifinals

|}

Final

References

Copa de la Reina
Women
Copa de la Reina de Fútbol seasons